The 1993 Youngstown State Penguins football team was an American football team represented Youngstown State University in the 1993 NCAA Division I-AA football season. In their eighth season under head coach Jim Tressel, the team compiled a 13–2 record and defeated Marshall in the 1993 NCAA Division I-AA Football Championship Game. It was Youngstown State's second national championship in three years.

Tailback Tamron Smith received the team's most valuable player award. The team's statistical leaders included Smith with 1,433 rushing yards and 120 points scored, Darnell Clark with 1,822 all-purpose yards, Mark Brungard with 1,504 passing yards, and Leon Jones with 177 tackles (including 103 solo tackles).

Schedule

References

Youngstown State
Youngstown State Penguins football seasons
NCAA Division I Football Champions
Youngstown State Penguins football